Zinga is a village in the Democratic Republic of the Congo in the Maniema Province.

External links
Satellite map at Maplandia.com

Populated places in Maniema